Francesco Superti  (active circa 1600) was an Italian painter.

Biography
He was born in Cremona and trained under Antonio Campi and Giovanni Battista Trotti. He painted in the churches of Sant'Antonio Abate and the Theatines in Cremona. A painting in San Nicola di Bari, Sestola is attributed to Superti.

References

Year of birth unknown
Year of death unknown
17th-century Italian painters
Italian male painters
Painters from Cremona